La Veigadouria is one of seven parishes in Boal, a municipality, within the province and autonomous community of Asturias, in northern Spain. 

The Asturian people of the parish live in several villages, including: El Bidural, Brañallibrel, A Cabana, Carbayal, El Cepón, El Gumio, Ouria, Ransal, Rozadas, Trevé, El Valle Seco and A Veigadouria.

External links
 Asturian society of economic and industrial studies, English language version of "Sociedad Asturiana de Estudios Económicos e Industriales" (SADEI)

Parishes in Boal